Surprise Spur is a prominent spur, the northernmost of three spurs on the southwest side of Ackerman Ridge in the La Gorce Mountains of Antarctica. First mapped by United States Geological Survey (USGS) from surveys and U.S. Navy air photos, 1960–64. So named by New Zealand Geological Survey Antarctic Expedition (NZGSAE) (1969–70) because, in the middle of an extensive region of purely basement rocks, slightly altered sedimentary rocks which seem to belong to the much younger Beacon series appear on this spur.

Mountains of Marie Byrd Land